Portrait of Fortunato Martinengo Cesaresco is a 1542 oil on canvas painting by Moretto da Brescia, now in the National Gallery, London. The use of X-ray photography during a 1973 restoration showed a table in front of the man with an open book on it.

History
The earliest mention of the work is in a mid 19th-century inventory of count Teodoro Lechi's collection - the family archives add that he acquired the work in Brescia on 19 September 1843 and on 9 January 1854 sold it on to Charles Henfrey of Turin, where Lechi was exiled from 1849 to 1859. In 1975 Cecil Gould cited documents in the National Gallery stating that in 1843 countess Marzia Martinengo Cesaresco had sold the painting to Lechi, who had married her daughter Clara. It passed from Henfry to Otto Mündler in 1856 and two years later was acquired by its present owner.

References

Bibliography
 Camillo Boselli, Il Moretto, 1498-1554, in "Commentari dell'Ateneo di Brescia per l'anno 1954 – Supplemento", Brescia 1954
Joseph Archer Crowe, Giovanni Battista Cavalcaselle, A history of painting in North Italy, London 1871
 Pietro Da Ponte, L'opera del Moretto, Brescia 1898
William Dickes, A greek motto misread at the National Gallery, in "Athenaeum", n.3423, 3 June 1893
György Gombosi, Moretto da Brescia, Basel 1943
Cecil Gould, The sixteenth-century italian schools, London 1975
 Pompeo Molmenti, Il Moretto da Brescia, Firenze 1898
 Pier Virgilio Begni Redona, Alessandro Bonvicino – Il Moretto da Brescia, Editrice La Scuola, Brescia 1988
 Ottavio Rossi, Elogi historici di bresciani illustri, Brescia 1620
 Adolfo Venturi, Storia dell'arte italiana, volume IX, La pittura del Cinquecento, Milano 1929

Paintings by Moretto da Brescia
1542 paintings
16th-century portraits
Portraits of men
Collections of the National Gallery, London